List for the Defence of the Interests of Commune of Linguère (in French: List pour la défense des intérêts de la commune de Linguère) was a political party in Linguère, Senegal. It existed around 1960.

Sources
Nzouankeu, Jacques Mariel. Les partis politiques sénégalais. Dakar: Editions Clairafrique, 1984.

Political parties in Senegal